The Sarasota Blues Fest was an annual music festival held at Ed Smith Stadium in Sarasota, Florida. In addition to all day live entertainment, the festival has vendors selling a wide array of food, drink and crafts.

History
The Sarasota Blues Fest was started in 1991 by the Sarasota Blues Society. They went bankrupt in 1992. Concert producer Barbara Strauss took over the Sarasota Blues Fest in 1993.  The festival is now incorporated by Strauss's company, Sovereign Ventures, Inc. The festival was originally held at the Sarasota County Fairgrounds but moved to Ed Smith Stadium Complex in 2006.
In 2011 The Sarasota Blues Fest and all rights to the name and property was purchased by ExtremeTix Inc., a Houston-based Ticketing Solutions and Event Services company.

Charity
Partial proceeds from the event go to a charity. Past recipients of donations have included United Cerebral Palsy, Police Athletic League Sailor Circus Capital Campaign, United Way, Florida Center for Child and Family Development & All Faiths Food Bank.

Past performers
 1993 - Pinetop Perkins, James Cotton, Derek Trucks, Chris Anderson
 1994 - Gregg Allman & Friends, Junior Wells, Michael Farris, Twinkle, Lil' Ed & The Blues Emperials
 1995 - Buddy Guy, Chris Duarte, Sandra Hall, Josh Smith
 1996 - Dr. John, Tab Benoit, Lady Bianca, Lucky Peterson, Floyd Miles, Sean Chambers
 1997 - The Fabulous Thunderbirds, Bobby "Blue" Bland, Tinsley Ellis, Bill Wharton "The Sauce Boss"
 1998 - Jimmie Vaughan, Gregg Allman, Derek Trucks, Bernard Allison, Mary Cutrofello
 1999 - Booker T & the MG's, Deborah Coleman, Henry "Son" Seals, Bryan Lee, Steven Seagal w/Dickey Betts & Lee Sklyr
 2000 - Gregg Allman & Friends, Lonnie Brooks, E.C. Scott, Walter Trout & The Free Radicals
 2001 - Delbert McClinton, Clarence "Gatemouth" Brown, Hubert Sumlin, Liz Manville Greeson, Walter Smith
 2002 - Jeff Healey Band, Little Milton, Eric Sardinas, Kelly Richie Band, Gibbs Brothers
 2003 - Solomon Burke, John Mayall & the Bluesbreakers, Coco Montoya, Eric Steckel Band, Delta Moon
 2004 - Ike Turner & Kings of Rhythm, Radiators, Larry McCray, Nick Curran & The Nitelifes, Robin Thrush
 2005 - Delbert McClinton, Shemekia Copeland, Sonny Landreth, The Lee Boys, Reggie Sears
 2006 - Gregg Allman, Magic Slim and the Teardrops, Maria Muldaur, Devon Allman, Jamie Eubanks
 2007 - Buddy Guy, Oteil and the Peacemakers, Zac Harmon, Mighty Lester, Conrad Oberg
 2008 - Bobby Rush, Bob Margolin & Diunna Greenleaf, JJ Grey & MOFRO, Jason Ricci, Wyatt Garey
 2009 - Little Feat, Duke Robillard, Larry McCray, Bruce Katz, Floyd Miles, Mojo Myles, Fogts Junior Allstars
 2010 - Elvin Bishop Band, Trombone Shorty & Orleans Avenue, Tommy Castro, Moreland & Arbuckle, Jake Haldenwang
 2011 - Los Lobos Band, Ryan Shaw, Shaun Murphy, Lightnin' Malcolm, Selwyn Birchwood Band, Mike Imbasciani with special guest Alex Shaw
 2012 - Delbert McClinton, Ana Popovic, Curtis Salgado, Paul Thorn, Royal Southern Brotherhood, Pett Crow.

References

External links
 Event Site
 Event Information
 The Heart and Soul of It All
 The "Must Sees" of 2008

Blues festivals in the United States
Music festivals in Florida
Recurring events established in 1991